Order and Chaos Online was a fantasy MMORPG video game developed by Gameloft's Beijing studio for Microsoft Windows, Windows Phone, iOS, and Android devices. The game was released for iOS on April 27, 2011, for Android on June 27, 2012, and for Windows 8.1 and Windows Phone on July 10, 2013. A successor titled Order & Chaos 2: Redemption was released in Fall 2015. The game is heavily inspired by World of Warcraft. This game was permanently closed by Gameloft on 16 February 2023 on all platforms.

History
About this Order & Chaos Online 3D MMORPG

Battle orcs and demons in this massive multiplayer MMORPG adventure.

Gather your friends to complete quests and explore a vast fantasy world. Be a hero and lead your guild to the top of the multiplayer leaderboards.

• Use an advanced character creation system to customize your hero, just like in a real MMORPG.
• Five races available: elves and humans strive for order, orcs and undead strive for chaos, and mendels are neutral. You can have up to five different characters in the game.
• Choose your gender, appearance, class and talents. With over 15,000 skills and 8,000 gear, your quest isn't ending anytime soon.

• Explore the world of Haradon alone or in a true multiplayer gaming experience: make friends or enemies, trade, challenge, communicate and much more. A wide variety of possibilities that will make you feel part of this fantasy universe.
• Join a group or guild to become stronger and coordinate attacks with your companions in the biggest challenges of our MMO games: our legendary dungeons.
• Participate in epic multiplayer fights and try to make your guild one of the best in Haradon.

• Travel on foot or using magic through the magnificent landscapes of a fantasy world: from dark forests to deserts, jungles, mountains and much more.
• Chat and interact with hundreds of characters to find over 1,500 quests online.

Battlefield is a new PVP mode where working together is more important than working alone. Try to capture the enemy team's flag and bring it to your base.

Get into battle faster with new mounts including the Blood Phantom Horse, Silver Despair, Peaceful Kraken and more.

Reception 

The game received "generally favorable" reviews, according to video game review aggregator Metacritic.

References

External links 
 

Android (operating system) games
Gameloft games
Vivendi franchises
IOS games
Fantasy massively multiplayer online role-playing games
2011 video games
Massively multiplayer online role-playing games
Ouya games
Video games developed in China
Windows games
Windows Phone games